The Kingdom of Britain may refer to:

 Kingdom of Great Britain (1707–1800)
 United Kingdom of Great Britain and Ireland (1801–1922)
 United Kingdom of Great Britain and Northern Ireland (1922–present)

See also 
 Kingdom of Brittany
 King of the Britons
 Terminology of the British Isles
 Monarchy of the United Kingdom
 Great Britain (disambiguation)
 Britain (disambiguation)